Leo Fabian Fahey (July 21, 1898 – March 31, 1950) was an American prelate of the Roman Catholic Church who served as coadjutor bishop of the Diocese of Baker City, Oregon from 1948 until his death in 1950.

Biography
Born in Bay St. Louis, Mississippi, Fahey was ordained a priest on May 29, 1926.

On May 13, 1948, he was appointed titular bishop of 'Ipsus' and coadjutor bishop of the Diocese of Baker City, Oregon and was consecrated on May 26, 1948. Fahey died while he was still coadjutor bishop.

Notes

1898 births
1950 deaths
People from Bay St. Louis, Mississippi
20th-century Roman Catholic bishops in the United States
Roman Catholic Diocese of Baker
Catholics from Mississippi